Terrence Dixon (born 27 August 1975) is a Liberian footballer. He played in two matches for the Liberia national football team in 1995. He was also named in Liberia's squad for the 1996 African Cup of Nations tournament.

References

1975 births
Living people
Liberian footballers
Liberia international footballers
1996 African Cup of Nations players
Place of birth missing (living people)
Association football defenders